Chun Je-Hun (born 13 September 1980) is a South Korean former football player.

External links

1980 births
Living people
South Korean footballers
FC Seoul players
Gimcheon Sangmu FC players
Association football midfielders
K League 1 players